This is the discography for British DJ Dave Lee.

Albums 

1993 Universe of Love
1997 Get Down Tonight (with Andrew Livingstone)
1998 Here Comes the Sunburst Band (as The Sunburst Band)
2002 Visions (as Jakatta)
2004 Until the End of Time (as The Sunburst Band)
2008 Moving with the Shakers (as The Sunburst Band)
2008 Doug's Disco Brain (as Doug Willis)
2009 The Remixes (with The Sunburst Band)
2010 The Phuture Ain't What It Used to Be (as Akabu)
2012 The Secret Life of Us (as The Sunburst Band)

Compilations 

1988 "The Garage Sound of Deepest New York"
1989 "Paradise Regained: The Garage Sound of Deepest New York Vol. 2"
1991 "The Garage Sound Volume III – The Third Generation"
1995 "Disco House Mixed by Joey Negro"
1996 "The Garage Sound Volume 4"
1997 "Disco Connection"
1997 "Jumpin'"
1998 "Jumpin' 2"
1999 "Disco Spectrum"
1999 "Can't Get High Without U"
2000 "Disco Spectrum 2"
2000 "The Voyage"
2000 "Disco Not Disco" (with Sean P)
2001 "Nite:Life 08"
2002 "Disco Spectrum 3"
2002 "Disco Not Disco Vol.2" (with Sean P)
2003 "Back to the Scene of the Crime"
2003 "Southport Weekender (with Gilles Peterson & Miguel Migs)
2003 "Pleasure House"
2003 "Joey Negro's Non-Stop Funky Mix"
2005 "In the Beginning"
2005 "In the House"
2005 "The Soul of Disco Vol.1" (with Sean P)
2006 "The Trip – Navigated by Joey Negro"
2006 "Destination Boogie" (with Sean P)
2006 "The Many Faces of Joey Negro Vol.1"
2007 "Back in the Box"
2007 "Lust – Art & Soul: A Personal Collection by Joey Negro"
2007 "Supafunkanova" (with Sean P)
2009 "Locked in the Vinyl Cellar" 
2009 "The Many Faces of Joey Negro Vol.2"
2009 "The Many Faces of Joey Negro Vol.2"
2010 "Backstreet Brit Funk" 
2010 "20 Years of Joey Negro" (with Grant Nelson)
2011 "The Soul of Disco Vol.2" (with Sean P)
2011 "The Soul of Disco Vol.3"
2012 "Go Go Get Down"
2013 "Remixed with Love Vol. 1 by Joey Negro"
2014 "Italo House Compiled by Joey Negro"
2016 "Remixed with Love Vol. 2 by Joey Negro"
2018 "Remixed with Love Vol. 3 by Joey Negro"

Singles 
Joey Negro
1990 "Do It, Believe It"
1991 Above & Beyond EP (with Andrew Livingstone and Viv Hope-Scott)
1991 "Do What You Feel" (with Andrew Livingstone, Viv Hope-Scott and Debbie French) - #36 UK
1991 "Reachin'" - #70 UK
1992 Enter Your Fantasy EP - #35 UK
1992 "Feel Your Body" (with Andrew Livingstone)
1993 "What Happened to the Music" (with The Trammps and Andrew Livingstone) - #52 UK
1993 "So Deep" (with Reese Project)
1993 "What a Life/Universe of Love" (with The Trammps)
1997 "Can't Get High Without U" (with Pete Z. and Taka Boom) - #1 US Dance
1999 "Must Be the Music" (with Taka Boom) - #8 UK
2000 "Saturday" (with Taka Boom) - #41 UK
2005 "Make a Move on Me" (with Taka Boom) - #11 UK, #59 Australia, #40 Ireland, #1 US Dance
2008 "Ride the Rhythm"
2008 "Love Hangover"
2010 "Can't Get High Without U" (with David Penn Remixes)
2010 "Beyond the Dance" (with The Revenge Remixes)
2010 "20 Years of Joey Negro Sampler" (with Grant Nelson Remixes)
2011 "Feel It" (with Alex Kenji Remix)
2011 "No Sugar" (with Gramophonedzie & Shea Soul)
2011 "Must Be the Music" (with Crazibiza Remixes)
2013 "I Need Somebody Tonight" (with Thelma Houston)
2014 "Candidate for Love" (with Horse Meat Disco)

Jakatta
2000 "American Dream" - #3 UK, #63 Australia
2001 "American Dream (Remix)" - #63 UK
2001 "So Lonely" (with Monsoon) - #8 UK, #51 Australia
2002 "My Vision" (with Seal) - #6 UK, #43 Australia
2002 "One Fine Day" (with Beth Hirsch) - #39 UK
2004 "Visions"
2005 "Scattering Stars"
2005 "Shimmering Stars" (with Michele Chiavarini)
2012 "American Dream" (with Supernova Remixes)
2012 "Scattering Stars" (with Ogris Debris Remixes)
2014 "American Dream" (with Andre Crom & Chi Thanh Remix)

Raven Maize
1989 "Together Forever" (with Mark Ryder, Romana Brooks and Blaze) - #67 UK
1996 "Together Forever '96"
2001 "The Real Life" - #12 UK
2002 "Fascinated" (with Michele Chiavarini and Katherine Ellis) - #37 UK
2012 "Fascinated" (with Alex Kenji Remixes)

The Sunburst Band
 The band includes Michele Chiavarini, Julian Crampton, Thomas Dyani-Akuru, Tony Remy, Michael J. Parlett & Colin Graham
1997 Sunburn EP (with Jessica Lauren)
1998 "Ease Your Mind"
1999 "Garden of Love"
1999 Radiant EP (with Michele Chiavarini)
2003 "Big Blow"
2004 "Everyday"
2004 "Thin Air / Everyday / U Make Me So Hot (Remixes)"
2004 "Far Beyond" (with Michele Chiavarini)
2004 "Fly Away" (with Pete Simpson)
2004 "Just Do It/Every Day" (with Luci Martin, Norma Jean Wright and Taka Boom)
2004 Thin Air EP (with Taka Boom)
2005 "He Is/Fly Away" (with Audiowhores Remixes)
2005 "U Make Me So Hot" (with YamWho? & BT Remixes)
2006 "For All Eternity/Twinkle" (with Idjut Boys Remixes)
2008 "Rough Times" (with Yolanda Wyns)
2008 "Fashion/Journey to the Sun" (with Pete Simpson and Katherine Ellis)
2008 "Journey to the Sun / Our Lives Are Shaped / Fashion" (with Dennis Ferrer & Elektrons Remixes)
2008 "Survivin'" (with Leroy Burgess) (with Milton Jackson & IG Culture Remixes)
2009 "Man of War" (with Henrik Schwarz, Idjut Boys & YamWho? Remixes)
2009 "Our Lives Are Shaped / We Can Live Forever" (with Grant Nelson & Simon Grey Remixes)
2009 "Put a Lyric in It" (with The Revenge, DJ Meme & Cool Million Remixes)
2009 "The Remixes Album Sampler" (with Kaje Trackheadz, Recloose & YamWho? Remixes)
2009 "Our Lives Are Shaped" (with Grant Nelson & Simon Grey Remixes)
2011 "Rough Times" (with Sean McCabe Remixes)
2012 "The Remixes" (with Opolopo, Andreas Saag & Atjazz Remixes)
2012 "In the Thick of It" (with Angela Johnson)
2013 "Record Store Day Special"
2013 "The Secret Life of Us" (with Directors Cut Signature Remixes)
2013 "Definition of Luv" (with Sean McCabe Remixes)
2013 "I'll Be There 4 U (Garden of Love)" (with Spiritchaser Remix)
2014 "Only Time Will Tell" featuring Angela Johnson (with Joey Negro Remix)
2014 Face the Fire EP

Doug Willis
1993 Syndrum Syndrome EP
1995 "Bodyshine"
1996 Down to the Disco EP
1997 Doug-Ism EP
1998 "Armed and Extremely Douglas" (with Michele Chiavarini and Taka Boom)
1998 Doug Shit EP (with Michele Chiavarini and Carolyn Harding)
2000 "Skate Dancer" (with Taka Boom)
2003 "Get Your Own"
2005 "I Know You, I Live You" (with Yolanda Wyns)
2007 "Doug Dastardly" (with Michele Chiavarini and Pete Simpson)
2007 "Dougswana" (with Zeke Manikiya and Michele Chiavarini)
2008 "Doug Biscuit / Spread Love / Dougswana" (with Audiowhores Remixes)
2011 Douggy Style EP
2012 Was Doug a Doughnut EP
2013 "Spread Love" (with Alex Kenji Remixes)
2014 Doug Mess on the Dancefloor EP

Prospect Park
1997 "Movin' On" (with Carolyn Harding) - #55 UK
1999 "ESP" (with Bernard Thomas and Carolyn Harding)
2001 "Surrender" (with Mr. Pink)
2002 "I Got This Feelin'" (with Michele Chiavarini and Taka Boom)
2003 "Spinnin'" (with Michele Chiavarini and Linda Clifford)
2005 "Get Down Tonight"

Mistura
1998 "Tonight" (with Maxine McClain)
1999 "Think Positive" (with Michele Chiavarini, Viv Hope-Scott and Carolyn Harding)
1999 "Runnin'" (with Luke Smith, Viv Hope-Scott and Carolyn Harding)
2002 "Sweet Magic" (with Michele Chiavarini and Taana Gardner)
2011 "Better Things to Come" (with Kadija Kamara)
2013 "Smile" (with Kendra Cash) (with Shur-i-kan Remixes)

Sessomatto
1996 "I'm Back"
1996 "Can't Fight the Feeling" (with Taka Boom)
2000 "Moody" (with Michele Chiavarini and Taka Boom)
2003 "I Need Somebody" (with Thelma Houston)
2006 "Movin' On" (with Michele Chiavarini and Carolyn Harding)
2007 "You're Gonna Love Me" (with Carolyn Harding)
2007 "Spring Sampler"
2009 "You're Gonna Love Me" (with Denis Naidanow Remixes)
2011 "All Over the World"/"Give It to Me"
2011 1988 EP

Z Factor
1996 "Gotta Keep Pushin'"
1999 "Give It on Up"
1999 "Make a Move on Me"
2001 "Ride The Rhythm"
2002 "Rock Ur Body"
2007 "Moody / Bang"
2008 "We'll Keep Climbing / Somebody" (with Dawn Tallman and Manfred Orange)
2010 "Makes You Crazy / The Piano Principle"
2011 "Keep On Jumpin'" (with Luigi Rocca Remix)
2012 "Sounds in the Air" (with Soul Purpose Remix)
2014 "Get in 2 the Music" (with Joey Negro Remix)
 
Foreal People
1998 "Does It Feel Good 2U?" (with Michele Chiavarini and Taka Boom)
1999 "Discotizer" (with Michele Chiavarini, Taka Boom and Dave Clarke)
1999 "Shake" (with David Grant)
2001 "Gotta Thing" (with Michele Chiavarini and Taana Gardner)

Akabu
2000 "Your Wildest Dreams" (with Michele Chiavarini and Viv Hope-Scott)
2001 "Ride the Storm" (Michele Chiavarini and Linda Clifford) - #69 UK
2003 "The Way"
2004 "Don't Hold Back" (with Michele Chiavarini and Steve Burton)
2005 "Phuture Bound" (with Michele Chiavarini)
2006 "Phuture Bound Remixes" (with Ame & Shur-i-kan Remixes)
2006 "I'm Not Afraid of the Future" (with Michele Chiavarini, Pete Simpson and Yoland Wynns)
2007 "I'm Not Afraid of the Future (Remixes)" (with DJ Fudge & Jimpster Remixes)
2009 "Sax My Bitch Up" (with Audiojack Remix)
2010 "Another Generation" (with Jimpster & THomas Gold Remixes)
2010 "If You Want It All" (with Motor City Drum Ensemble Remix)
2010 "Another World" (with Andre Lodemann Remix)
2011 "Life Is So Strange" (with Tony Momrelle)
2011 "Life Is So Strange" (with Deetron & Lovebirds Remixes)
2011 "The Big Room Mixes EP" (with Thomas Gold, Ron May & Audiojack Remixes)
2011 "The Phuture Ain't What It Used to Be" (with Yass & Spirit Catcher Remixes)
2012 Crystalised EP (with Foremost Poets)
2013 "Everybody Wants Something" (with Alex Mills)
2013 "Again" (with Giom and Kadija Kamara)
2014 "Everybody Wants Something" Feat. Alex Mills (with Kolombo and Giom Remixes)

M-D-Emm
1988 Get Acidic EP, as M-D-Emm (with Mike Cheal and Mark Ryder)
1988 "Burn It Down", as M-D-Emm (with Mike Cheal and Mark Ryder)
1988 "Don't Stop (We're So Hot)", as M-D-Emm (with Mike Cheal and Mark Ryder)
1988 "Fanning the Flames", as M-D-Emm (with Mike Cheal and Mark Ryder)
1988 "Get Busy (It's Party Time)", as M-D-Emm (with Mike Cheal and Mark Ryder) - #100 UK
1988 Playin' with Fire EP, as M-D-Emm (with Mike Cheal and Mark Ryder) - #98 UK
1989 "Get Hip to This", as M-D-Emm (with Mike Cheal, Mark Ryder and Nasih) - #86 UK
1989 "I Wanna Do It", as 2 the Max (with Mike Cheal)
 NOTE: Dave Lee left M-D-Emm after 1990; the name was continued by Mark Ryder.

Skeletor
1989 "Do You Want Me" (with Mark Ryder)

Masters of the Universe
1989 "Check It Out" (with Mark Ryder)
1990 "Space Talk"

Energise
1990 "Report to the Dancefloor"

Life on Earth
1990 "Can't Give You Up" (with Andrew Livingstone, Pat Leacock and Winston Marvaya)

Pacha
1991 "One Kiss" (with Blaze and Debbie French)
2011 "One Kiss" (with Matt Bandy Remixes)

Swingtime Dee
1993 "You & I / Motivation"
1996 Your Wildest Dreams"

Agora
1994 Latin Connection EP
2009 "Montayo" (with Mark Grant Remixes)

Cookie
1994 "Choose Me"
1997 "Best Part of Me"

The Away Team
1994 "Our Love" (with Andrew Livingstone and Gerideau)
1995 "On My Mind"

Hedboys
1994 "Girls & Boys" (with Andrew Livingstone)
1995 Mutual DIY EP

Fibre Foundation
1995 "Weekend"

Jupiter Beyond
1995 Stargazer EP

Men from Mars
1995 Life on Mars EP (with Andrew Livingstone)
1995 Sun Power EP

Mankind
1997 "Make It Hot / Don't Keep Me Waiting"

Raw Essence
1999 "The Loving Game / Sweet Embrace" (with Michele Chiavarini and Maxine McClain)
2000 "Do U Love What U Feel", as Raw Essence (with Maxine McClain)

Mr. Pink presents The Program
2001 "Love & Affection" (with Mr. Pink) - #22 UK

Il Padrinos
2002 "That's How Good Your Love Is" (with Danny Rampling and Jocelyn Brown)

Erro
2004 "Change for Me"

Dave Lee
2002 "Love Is Freedom" (with Ewan Kelly)
2005 "You're Not Alone" (with Michele Chiavarini and Ann Saunderson)
2007 "Latronica"
2008 "Mucho Macho"
2010 "As Long as I Got You" (with Conan Liquid Remixes)

Tamara's World
2006 Trampoline (with Katherine Ellis)

AC Soul Symphony
2007 The Kinda Love
2007 "What's Happening" (with Michele Chiavarini and Pete Simpson)
2010 "Still in Love" (with Ricci Benson)

Brad Hed''
2007 "The Girlz & Boyz" (with Andrew Livingstone)
2009 "The Real Life"
2013 "The Girls & Boys" (with Crazibiza Remix)Kola Kube2011 "Why" (with Diane Charlemagne) (with Hot Toddy Remixes)
2012 "Break My Heart" (with Choklate)
2012 "Everybody Needs Somebody" (Faze Action Remixes)Sadam Ant2013 "Daft Funk"Azucar'''
2013 "Let Your Body Rock" (with Kyodai Remixes)

References 

Discographies of British artists
Electronic music discographies